Sunjong, the Emperor Yunghui (25 March 1874 – 24 April 1926),  was the second and the last Emperor of Korea, of the Yi dynasty, ruling from 1907 until 1910. Sunjong elevated to the throne after his predecessor, Gojong, was forced to abdicate by the Japanese Empire. Hence, Sunjong has been characterized by historians as being a powerless puppet emperor of the Japanese, reigning just over three years until Korea was officially annexed in 1910.

Biography

Crown Prince of Korea 
Sunjong was the second son of Emperor Gojong and Empress Myeongseong. When he became two years old in 1876, Sunjong was proclaimed the Crown Prince of Joseon. In 1882, he married a daughter of the Yeoheung Min clan, who later became Empress Sunmyeonghyo. She later died at the age of 31 on 5 November 1904 due to the severe depression, after trying to protect her mother-in-law (Empress Myeongseong, also a member of the Yeoheung Min clan) from her assassination on 8 October 1895 by the Japanese military.

When his father proclaimed Korean Empire in 1897, Sunjong was appointed as Crown Prince of Imperial Korea on 12 October 1897. On 29 June 1898, he was appointed as Field Marshal of Imperial Korean Army. Sunjong remarried again 3 years later to daughter of Yoon Taek-young, Yun Jeung-sun of the Haepyeong Yun clan, who was 20 years his junior, on 11 December 1906, and became Crown Princess Consort Yun (later Empress Sunjeong).

Emperor of Korea 
On 19 July 1907, Gojong was deposed as a result of Japanese coercion, and Sunjong was made Emperor of Korea. His coronation was proceeded in Don-doek-jeon. He was proclaimed heir to the throne of Prince Imperial Yeong, the younger half-brother of Sunjong, and moved from Deoksugung Palace to the imperial residence at Changdeokgung Palace.

Sunjong's reign was limited by the gradually increasing armed intervention of the Japanese government in Korea. In July 1907, he was proclaimed emperor of Korea but was immediately forced to enter into the Japan–Korea Treaty of 1907. This treaty allowed the Japanese government to supervise and intervene in the administration and governance of Korea, which also allowed for the appointment of Japanese ministers within the government.

While under Japanese supervision, the Korean army was dismissed on the pretext of lack of public finance regulations. In 1909, Japan implemented the Japan–Korea Protocol which effectively removed Korea's judicial power. Meanwhile, Japan dispatched Itō Hirobumi, Japanese Resident-General of Korea, to negotiate with Russia over problems involving Korea and Manchuria. However, Itō was assassinated by Ahn Jung-geun at Harbin, which led to the Japanese annexation of Korea in 1910. Pro-Japanese politicians, such as Song Byung-jun and Lee Wan-yong, defected, merging Korea with Japan by fabricating Korea's willingness and establishing the Japan–Korea Annexation Treaty on 29 August 1910.

Although still existent de jure, the intervention by the Japanese government effectively ended Sunjong's reign over the Korean Empire de facto and he became essentially powerless within three years of ruling. Japan, in effect, officially abolished the Korean Empire on 29 August 1910, ending 519 years of the Joseon dynasty.

After abdication
After the annexation treaty, the former Emperor Sunjong and his wife, Empress Sunjeong, lived the rest of their lives virtually imprisoned in Changdeokgung Palace in Keijō. Sunjong could not exercise any power as emperor because there were only pro-Japanese politicians in government. After the Korean Empire collapsed, Sunjong was demoted from emperor to king. Japan allowed him the title of King Yi of Changdeok Palace and allowed for the title to be inherited.

Sunjong died on 24 April 1926, in Changdeokgung and is buried with his two wives at the imperial tomb of Yureung (유릉, 裕陵) in the city of Nanyōshū. His state funeral on 10 June 1926, was a catalyst for the June 10th Movement against Japanese rule. He had no children.

Family
 Great-Great-Great-Great-Great-Grandfather
 Yi Hyeok, Prince Eui (이혁 의원군, 義原君 李爀) (13 June 1661 – 12 November 1722) 
 Adoptive-Great-Great-Great-Great-Great-Grandfather: Yi Hwan, Prince Yang (이환 양원군, 李煥 陽原君) (April 1658 – March 1724)
 Great-Great-Great-Great-Great-Grandmother
 Princess Consort Kwon of the Andong Kwon clan (군부인 안동권씨) (27 August 1664 – 7 April 1735)
 Adoptive-Great-Great-Great-Great-Great-Grandmother: Princess Consort Min of the Yeoheung Min clan (군부인 여흥 민씨)
 Great-Great-Great-Great-Grandfather
 Yi Suk, Prince Anheung (이숙 안흥군, 李俶 安興君) (9 October 1693 – 7 April 1768)
 Great-Great-Great-Great-Grandmother
 Princess Consort Ryu of the Munhwa Ryu clan (군부인 문화류씨) (3 January 1696 – 13 January 1755)
 Great-Great-Great-Grandfather
 Yi Jin-ik (이진익, 李鎭翼) (25 September 1728 – 26 April 1796)
 Great-Great-Great-Grandmother
 Lady Jo of the Hanyang Jo clan (본관: 한양조씨); (조도건의 딸) daughter of Jo Do-gyeon (조도건, 趙道健)
 Great-Great-Grandfather
 Yi Byeong-won (6 April 1752 – 11 November 1822) (이병원, 李秉源)
 Adoptive-Great-Great-Grandfather: Yi Jin, Prince Eunsin (이진 은신군, 李禛 恩信君) (11 January 1755 – 29 March 1771) 
 Great-Great-Grandmother
 Lady Jeong of the Yeonil Jeong clan (본관: 연일 정씨); (정의환의 딸) daughter of Jeong Eui-hwan (정의환, 鄭義煥)
 Adoptive-Great-Great-Grandmother: Princess Consort Namyang of the Namyang Hong clan (남양군부인 남양 홍씨, 南陽郡夫人 南陽 洪氏) (1755 – 21 March 1829)
 Great-Grandfather
 Yi Gu, Prince Namyeon (22 August 1788 – 19 March 1836) (이구 남연군, 南延君)
 Great-Grandmother
 Princess Consort Min of the Yeoheung Min clan (26 June 1788 – 1831) (군부인 여흥민씨, 驪興府大夫人 閔氏)
 Grandfather
 Yi Ha-Eung, King Heungseon of the Jeonju Yi clan (21 December 1820 – 22 February 1898) (흥선왕 이하응)
 Adoptive Grandfather: Yi Heon, King Munjo of Joseon (18 September 1809 – 25 June 1830) (조선의 문조 이영)
 Grandmother
 Queen Sunmok of the Yeoheung Min clan (3 February 1818 – 8 January 1898) (순목왕비 민씨)
 Adoptive Grandmother: Queen Sinjeong of the Pungyang Jo clan (21 January 1809 – 4 June 1890) (신정왕후 조씨)
 Father
 Emperor Gojong of the Korean Empire (대한제국 고종) (8 September 1852 – 21 January 1919)
 Mother
 Empress Myeongseong of the Yeoheung Min clan (명성황후 민씨) (17 November 1851– 8 October 1895)
 Maternal Grandfather: Min Chi-rok, Internal Prince Yeoseong (민치록, 閔致祿) (1799–1858)
 Maternal Grandmother: Internal Princess Consort Hanchang of the Hansan Yi clan (한창부부인 이씨, 韓昌府夫人 李氏) (1818-1874)
 Brothers
 Older half-brother: Yi Seon, Prince Wanhwa (16 April 1868 – 12 January 1880) (이선 완화군)
 Unnamed older brother (born 4 November 1871 – 8 November 1871)
 Unnamed younger brother (born 5 April 1875 – 18 April 1875)
 Unnamed younger brother (born 18 February 1878 – 5 June 1878)
 Younger half-brother: Yi Kang, Prince Uihwa (30 March 1877 – August 1955) (이강 의화군)
 Younger half-brother: Yi Eun, Crown Prince Uimin (20 October 1897 – 1 May 1970) (이은 의민태자)
 Younger half-brother: Prince Yi Yuk (3 July 1914 – 22 January 1915) (이육)
 Younger half-brother: Prince Yi U (20 August 1915 – 25 July 1916) (이우)
 Sisters
 Unnamed older half-sister (born 1871–1872)
 Unnamed older sister (born 13 February 1873 – 28 September 1873)
 Unnamed younger half-sister (born 1879–1880)
 Younger half-sister: Princess Deokhye (25 May 1912 – 21 April 1989) (덕혜옹주, 德惠翁主)
 Consorts:
 Empress Sunmyeong of the Yeoheung Min clan (순명황후 민씨) (20 November 1872– 5 November 1904) – born to Min Tae-ho, leader of the Yeoheung Min clan; relative of Empress Myeongseong. She died before her husband was enthroned.
 Yun Jeung-sun, Empress Sunjeong of the Haepyeong Yun clan (순정황후 윤증순 윤씨) (19 September 1894– 3 February 1966) – daughter of Marquis Yun Taek-yeong.

Honours
 : Founder of the Order of the Auspicious Phoenix(서봉장,瑞鳳章)
 
 Grand Cordon of the Order of the Chrysanthemum – 16 January 1901; Collar – 17 October 1907
 Korean Colonization Decoration - 1 August 1912
 : Grand Cordon of the Royal Order of Leopold

Ancestry

Gallery

In popular culture
 Portrayed by Ahn Sang-woo in the 2016 period drama film The Last Princess.

See also
History of Korea
List of monarchs of Korea

Notes

References

External links
 

1874 births
1926 deaths
Korean Empire emperors
Monarchs who abdicated